Baldrige is a surname. Notable people with the surname include:

 Howard Malcolm Baldrige (1894–1985), U. S. Representative from Nebraska.
 Malcolm Baldrige Jr. (1922–1987), commonly referred to as Malcolm Baldrige or "Mac" Baldrige; United States Secretary of Commerce. Son of H. Malcolm Baldrige, and eponym for the Malcolm Baldrige National Quality Award.
 Letitia Baldrige (1926–2012), etiquette expert and public relations executive.  Daughter of H. Malcolm Baldrige
 Thomas J. Baldrige (1872–1964), Pennsylvania Attorney General and President Judge of the Superior Court, uncle of Howard M. Baldrige

See also
 Malcolm Baldrige National Quality Award
 Baldridge